Vít Kopřiva and Jiří Lehečka were the defending champions but chose not to defend their title.

Luciano Darderi and Fernando Romboli won the title after defeating Diego Hidalgo and Cristian Rodríguez 6–4, 2–6, [10–5] in the final.

Seeds

Draw

References

External links
 Main draw

Aspria Tennis Cup - Doubles
2022 Doubles